Bolbbalgan4, also known as BOL4 or Blushing Youth, is a South Korean musical act formed by Shofar Music in 2016. They appeared on Superstar K6 in 2014 before signing a contract with their current agency. BOL4 was originally a duo consisting of Ahn Ji-young and Woo Ji-yoon. They debuted with the single "Fight Day" from the mini-album Red Ickle on April 22, 2016. The first syllable of the Korean word  "puberty" is pronounced the same as the Sino-Korean numeral four, and accordingly the group name is sometimes shortened to BOL4.

The duo went on a temporary hiatus due to Ahn's music classes requirements in the first half of 2018. Bolbbalgan4 signed with King Records and debuted in Japan on June 5, 2019, with the mini-album Red Planet (Japan Edition).

On April 2, 2020, Shofar Music announced that Woo Ji-yoon had left the duo, and Ahn Ji-young will continue to promote as Bolbbalgan4.

Formation
Jiyoung and Jiyoon were both raised in Yeongju, North Gyeongsang Province, and were classmates. They had previously competed SuperStarK6 in 2014. Since they were young they had dreamed of becoming singers. The name of their duo was built on the grounds that they wanted to make the kind of pure, honest music that can only be found in adolescence. Jiyoon portrays the "blushing" part of the name because she is often shy, while Jiyoung portrays "youth" because she acts like an adolescent girl.

Members

Current
 Ahn Ji-young – main vocals

Former
 Woo Ji-yoon – guitar, rapping, backing vocals

Discography

Studio albums

Extended plays

Singles

As lead artist

Collaborations

As featured artist

Soundtrack appearances

Other charted songs

Concert and tours

Headlining concerts
 BOL4 1st Solo Concert "Red Planet" (2016)
 BOL4 1st Concert in Taipei (2017)
 BOL4 2nd Solo Concert "Imagine" (2017-2018)
 BOL4 3rd Solo Concert "Travel" (2018)

BOL4 1st Solo Concert "Red Planet" (2016)

BOL4 1st Concert in Taipei (2017)

BOL4 2nd Solo Concert "Imagine" (2017-2018)

BOL4 3rd Solo Concert "Travel" (2018)

Headlining tours
 2019 BOL4 Asia Tour "Blossom" (2019)
 2019 BOL4 Tour Concert "Two Five" (2019)
 BOL4  Live Tour 2020 "Love" (2020)

2019 BOL4 Asia Tour "Blossom"

2019 BOL4 Tour Concert "Two Five"

BOL4  Live Tour 2020 "Love"

Showcase
 BOL4  1st Live Showcase 宇宙をあげる～ (2018)

Videography

Music videos

Television appearances

Variety shows

Awards and nominations

Notes

References

External links
 

South Korean pop music groups
K-pop music groups
Musical groups established in 2016
South Korean girl groups
2016 establishments in South Korea
South Korean musical duos
Korean Music Award winners
Melon Music Award winners
Pop music duos
Female musical duos